The 1999 season was the Green Bay Packers' 79th in the National Football League (NFL) and their 81st overall. It was the first and only season for head coach Ray Rhodes. The Packers finished 8–8, posting their worst record since Brett Favre took over the helm as the Packers' starting quarterback, and also missing the playoffs for the first time since 1992.

Offseason

1999 NFL draft 
In the 1999 NFL draft, the Packers selected free safety Antuan Edwards in the first round (25th overall). Notably, the Packers drafted future Pro Bowl wide receiver Donald Driver in the seventh round (213th overall).

 Players highlighted in yellow indicate players selected to the Pro Bowl during their NFL career.

Undrafted free agents

Personnel

Staff

Roster

Preseason

Regular season 
The Packers finished in fourth place in the NFC Central division with an 8–8 record, behind the 8–8 Detroit Lions due to a conference record tiebreaker.

Schedule 

Note: Intra-division opponents are in bold text.

Game summaries

Week 1

Week 8: vs. Seattle Seahawks

Standings

Awards and records 
 Brett Favre, NFC leader, pass attempts (595)

Milestones 
 Brett Favre, third 4,000-yard passing season (finished season with 4,091)

References 

Green Bay Packers seasons
Green Bay Packers
Green